Chingizid is a genus of moths belonging to the family Cossidae. The genus was described by Yakovlev in 2011.

Species
Chingizid gobiana (Daniel, 1970)
Chingizid kosachevi Yakovlev, 2012
Chingizid transaltaica (Daniel, 1970)

References

Cossinae
Moth genera